Shigeko Yuki (Sakai, Osaka, December 2, 1900 – December 30, 1969) was a Japanese writer.

Life
Shigeko was born December 2, 1900, in Sakai City.

Her mother died when Shigeko was 10 years old. In 1919, Shigeko enrolled in Kobe Women's College to study music, but dropped out due to objections from her family. Even so, she continued to study music. She studied under the composer and pianist Rolange in 1922. In 1924 she married the painter Usaburo Ihara (伊原宇 三郎, 1894-1976). The following year, she moved to France, where she studied composition and piano until 1929. Together with Ihara, Shigeko had three sons and a daughter before separating in 1945. She would later write of her experience with marriage in Yasashii Otto (やさしい良人, My Tender Husband). Rather than focus on the guilt of breaking up a marriage, Shigeko writes about the need for independence in this work. Resisting tradition and striving for  independence are narrative points shared by many of Shigeko's female characters. 

After her divorce, Shigeko began writing children's literature professionally. The editor in chief of the magazine Sakuhin (作品), Yagioka Eiji encouraged her to write novels. With her second novel, Hon no Hanashi (本の話, A Tale of Books), Shigeko became the winner of the very first postwar Akutagawa Prize in 1949. During this time, Shigeko was incorrectly diagnosed with tuberculosis. The mistake went uncorrected for three years.

An avid reader, Shigeko's favorite works included a Japanese translation of Life and Love of the Insect (1911) by Jean Henri Fabre, as well as the thesis on Kansoku no riron (A Theory of Observation) by Yukawa Hideki. The latter motivated Shigeko to enroll in a course on theoretical physics at Rikkyou University in 1954.

In 1955, Shigeko's 1951 novel, Jochūkko (女中ッ子, Au Pair) was made into a film by Tomotaka Tasaka (田坂 具隆).

Shigeko died on December 30, 1969, of a blood poisoning related to diabetes mellitus.

Works (selection) 
 Yagurumasō (Forest Carnations), 1947
 Hon no hanashi (本の話)
 Kokubetsu (Farewell), 1951
 Yubiwa no Hanashi (The Tale of a Ring), 1951
 Jochūkko (女中ッ子, Au Pair), 1951
 Fuyu no Ki (Bushes in Winter), 1953
 Hyōhakku (Wandering), 1954
 Akasaka no Kyōdai (赤坂の姉妹, The Akasaka Sisters), 1960
 Keiyaku Kekkon (契約結婚, Marriage by Contract), 1961
 Yasashii Otto (やさしい良人, My Tender Husband), 1963

Bibliography 
 Sachiko Schierbeck: Japanese Women Novelists in the 20th Century. 104 Biographies 1900-93. Museum Tusculanum Press, 1994, S. 128–131.

References

1900 births
1969 deaths
Deaths from diabetes
People from Sakai, Osaka
Japanese expatriates in France
20th-century Japanese women writers
20th-century Japanese writers